Nathan Goodell (August 8, 1798 – June 2, 1883) was an American politician who served as the fifth and ninth mayor of Green Bay, Wisconsin.

Biography
Goodell was born on August 8, 1798 in Pomfret, Connecticut. He was the eleventh of twelve children born to Richard and Marcia Goodell. Goodell moved to Jefferson County, New York and married Hannah Mosely Weeks, the daughter of a Swedenborgian clergyman. They had two children. After their marriage, they moved to Detroit, Michigan before settling in Green Bay. Goodell died from apparent pneumonia on June 2, 1883.

Career
Goodell was mayor in 1859 and 1864. He was also Superintendent of Streets for a number of years.

References

People from Pomfret, Connecticut
People from Jefferson County, New York
Politicians from Detroit
Mayors of Green Bay, Wisconsin
1798 births
1883 deaths
Deaths from pneumonia in Wisconsin
19th-century American politicians